Alpine Tragedy is a 1927 German silent drama film directed by Robert Land and starring Lucy Doraine, Arnold Korff and Vladimir Gajdarov. The film was based on the 1909 novel of the same title by Richard Voß. It was shot at the Staaken Studios in Berlin. The film's sets were designed by the art directors Andrej Andrejew and Erich Zander. It was released by the German branch of the American company First National Pictures.

Cast
 Lucy Doraine as Gräfin Josette da Rimini
 Arnold Korff as Graf da Rimini
 Vladimir Gajdarov as Maler Sivo Courtien
 Hanni Hoess as Maira
 Fritz Kortner as Mairas Vater
 Wolfgang Zilzer as Fredo, Lehrer
 Eugen Neufeld as Graf Pinedo
 Dene Morel as Prinz René
 Louis Ralph as Vital, Bergführer

References

Bibliography

External links 
 

1927 films
Films of the Weimar Republic
German drama films
1927 drama films
1920s German-language films
Films directed by Robert Land
German silent feature films
German black-and-white films
Silent drama films
1920s German films
Films shot at Staaken Studios